Hamlin Township is a township in Brown County, Kansas, USA.  As of the 2000 census, its population was 344.

Geography

The streams of Euchre Creek, Spring Branch, Terrapin Creek and Walnut Creek run through this township.

References
 USGS Geographic Names Information System (GNIS)

External links
 US-Counties.com
 City-Data.com

Townships in Brown County, Kansas
Townships in Kansas